Christopher George is an American television and film actor.

Chris or Christopher George may also refer to:
 Christopher Paul George (born 1980), American entrepreneur and convicted felon
 Christopher George (judoka) (born 1983), Trinidad and Tobago judoka
 Chris George (left-handed pitcher), current Major League Baseball pitcher in the Baltimore Orioles organization
 Chris George (right-handed pitcher), former Major League Baseball pitcher for the Milwaukee Brewers
 Christopher George (rower), British lightweight rower

See also
George Christopher (disambiguation)
George (surname)